Israel Medical Association (IMA), is a professional association of physicians in Israel.

History
The association traces its origins to the Hebrew Medicinal Society for Jaffa and the Jaffa District, founded in 1912, which later became the Hebrew Medical Association in the Land of Israel (HMA).  Dr. Moshe Sherman, the country's first otolaryngologist, founded the association together with five other physicians.  In 1935, he  was elected chairman of the Israel Medical Association and later served as its honorary president.

The IMA has a world fellowship program open to physicians around the world. The current head of the Medical Association Chairman is Dr. Leonid Eidelman.

In 2007, Dr. Yoram Blacher, chairman of the IMA since 1995, was named president of the World Medical Association. 

The association marked its centennial year in November 2011 with a symposium and exhibition at the European Union headquarters in Brussels. The events were organized by the Belgian Jewish Doctors’ Group, Bnai Brit International and the Board of Deputies of British Jews. 

In January 2019, the Israel Medical Association banned members from performing conversion therapy on patients.

Publications
The association publishes two journals: Harefuah (Medicine) in Hebrew with English abstracts and Israel Medical Association Journal (IMAJ).

See also
Aron Brand

References

External links
 Official site

Medical associations based in Israel
Organizations established in 1912